Ismail Vasilev Yuseinov (Bulgarian: Исмаил Василев Юсеинов, born 10 February 1948) is a retired Bulgarian lightweight freestyle wrestler who competed at the 1972 Summer Olympics. Between 1970 and 1976 he won six medals at the world and European championships, becoming the lightweight European champion in 1970 and 1972.

References

External links
 

1948 births
Living people
Olympic wrestlers of Bulgaria
Wrestlers at the 1972 Summer Olympics
Bulgarian male sport wrestlers
European Wrestling Championships medalists
World Wrestling Championships medalists